Mountain Hill is an unincorporated community in Pittsylvania County, in the U.S. state of Virginia.

References

Unincorporated communities in Virginia
Unincorporated communities in Pittsylvania County, Virginia